Election of the President of the Senate of the Czech Republic was held on 19 November 2014. Milan Štěch was reelected for his third term.

Background and voting 
Czech Social Democratic Party has won 2014 Senate election despite heavy losses. The incumbent Senate President Milan Štěch remained Senator and announced his intention to run for another term.

Election was held on 19 November 2014. Štěch was the only candidate and received 70 votes of 78 and thus was elected for his third term.

References

President of the Senate
1996
President of the Senate of the Czech Republic election